With the 1911 season, the Superbas changed the team name to the Brooklyn Trolley Dodgers. However, the team still struggled, finishing in seventh place.

Regular season

Season standings

Record vs. opponents

Notable transactions 
 April 1911: Hub Northen was purchased by the Dodgers from the Cincinnati Reds.
 September 16, 1911: Elmer Steele was purchased by the Dodgers from the Pittsburgh Pirates.

Roster

Player stats

Batting

Starters by position 
Note: Pos = Position; G = Games played; AB = At bats; H = Hits; Avg. = Batting average; HR = Home runs; RBI = Runs batted in

Other batters 
Note: G = Games played; AB = At bats; H = Hits; Avg. = Batting average; HR = Home runs; RBI = Runs batted in

Pitching

Starting pitchers 
Note: G = Games pitched; IP = Innings pitched; W = Wins; L = Losses; ERA = Earned run average; SO = Strikeouts

Other pitchers 
Note: G = Games pitched; IP = Innings pitched; W = Wins; L = Losses; ERA = Earned run average; SO = Strikeouts

Relief pitchers 
Note: G = Games pitched; W = Wins; L = Losses; SV = Saves; ERA = Earned run average; SO = Strikeouts

Notes

References 
Baseball-Reference season page
Baseball Almanac season page

External links 
1911 Brooklyn Trolley Dodgers uniform
Brooklyn Dodgers reference site
Acme Dodgers page 
Retrosheet

Los Angeles Dodgers seasons
Brooklyn Trolley Dodgers season
Brooklyn Trolley Dodgers
1910s in Brooklyn
Park Slope